Ukraine competed at the 2004 Summer Olympics in Athens, Greece, from 13 to 29 August 2004. This was the nation's third consecutive appearance at the Summer Olympics in the post-Soviet era. The National Olympic Committee of Ukraine sent the nation's largest ever delegation to these Games. A total of 240 athletes, 125 men and 115 women, took part in 21 sports. Women's handball was the only team-based sport in which Ukraine had its representation at these Games for the first time. There was only a single competitor in modern pentathlon and taekwondo.

The Ukrainian team featured several Olympic medalists from Sydney, including skeet shooter Mykola Milchev, heavyweight wrestler David Saldadze (who eventually represented Uzbekistan at the 2008 Summer Olympics in Beijing), triple jumper Olena Hovorova, double defending swimming champion Yana Klochkova, and butterfly swimmer Denys Sylantyev, who later became the nation's flag bearer in the opening ceremony. Double sculls rower Svitlana Maziy and freestyle swimmer Pavlo Khnykin were among the athletes to compete in fourth Olympic Games, although they originally played for either Soviet Union or the Unified Team. Rapid fire pistol shooter Oleh Tkachov, at age 42, was the oldest athlete of the team, while butterfly swimmer Kateryna Zubkova was the youngest at age 16.

Ukraine left Athens with a total of 22 medals, 8 golds, 5 silver, and 9 bronze, being considered the nation's most successful Olympics since its debut in 1996. Most of these medals were awarded to the athletes in track and field, gymnastics, and swimming. Being the major highlight of the games, Yana Klochkova set a historic milestone for Ukraine as the first female swimmer to defend Olympic titles in the individual medley (both 200 and 400 m) at two consecutive Games. Three more female Ukrainian athletes won Olympic gold medals for the first time in their respective events: Olena Kostevych in pistol shooting, Nataliya Skakun in weightlifting, and Irini Merleni in freestyle wrestling. Ukraine 's team-based athletes proved particularly successful in Athens, as the women's handball team took home the bronze medal in the tournament. Originally, Ukraine had won a total of 23 Olympic medals at these Games. On December 5, 2012, the International Olympic Committee and the IAAF stripped off shot putter Yuriy Bilonoh's gold medal after drug re-testings of his samples were discovered positive.

Medalists

|  style="text-align:left; width:72%; vertical-align:top;"|

| style="text-align:left; width:23%; vertical-align:top;"|

Archery

Three Ukrainian archers qualified each for the men's and women's individual archery, and a spot each for both men's and women's teams.

Men

Women

Athletics

Ukrainian athletes have so far achieved qualifying standards in the following athletics events (up to a maximum of 3 athletes in each event at the 'A' Standard, and 1 at the 'B' Standard). On December 5, 2012, the International Olympic Committee and the IAAF stripped off Ukrainian shot putter Yuriy Bilonoh's gold medal after drug re-testings of his samples were discovered positive.

Men
Track & road events

Field events

Women
Track & road events

Field events

Combined events – Heptathlon

Boxing

The Ukrainian boxing team at the 2004 Olympics consisted of six boxers.  Only one was defeated in his first bout as four of the six boxers advanced to the quarterfinals.  They all lost there, keeping Ukraine from winning any boxing medals.

Canoeing

Sprint
Men

Women

Qualification Legend: Q = Qualify to final; q = Qualify to semifinal

Cycling

Road
Men

Women

Track
Pursuit

Omnium

Mountain biking

Diving

Ukrainian divers qualified for eight individual spots at the 2004 Olympic Games. One Ukrainian synchronized diving team qualified through the 2004 FINA Diving World Cup series.

Men

Women

Fencing

Ten Ukrainian fencers, eight men and two women, qualified for the following events.

Men

Women

Gymnastics

Artistic
Men
Team

Individual finals

Women
Team

Individual finals

Rhythmic

Trampoline

Handball

Women's tournament

Roster

Group play

Quarterfinals

Semifinals

Bronze medal match

 Won bronze medal

Judo

Eight Ukrainian judoka (six men and two women) qualified for the 2004 Summer Olympics.

Men

Women

Modern pentathlon

One Ukrainian athlete qualified to compete in the modern pentathlon event through the European Championships.

Rowing

Ukrainian rowers qualified the following boats:

Men

Women

Qualification Legend: FA=Final A (medal); FB=Final B (non-medal); FC=Final C (non-medal); FD=Final D (non-medal); FE=Final E (non-medal); FF=Final F (non-medal); SA/B=Semifinals A/B; SC/D=Semifinals C/D; SE/F=Semifinals E/F; R=Repechage

Sailing

Ukrainian sailors have qualified one boat for each of the following events.

Men

Women

Open

M = Medal race; OCS = On course side of the starting line; DSQ = Disqualified; DNF = Did not finish; DNS= Did not start; RDG = Redress given

Shooting

Eleven Ukrainian shooters (six men and five women) qualified to compete in the following events:

Men

Women

Swimming

Ukrainian swimmers earned qualifying standards in the following events (up to a maximum of 2 swimmers in each event at the A-standard time, and 1 at the B-standard time):

Men

Women

Synchronized swimming

Two Ukrainian synchronized swimmers qualified a spot in the women's duet.

Taekwondo

Ukraine has qualified a single taekwondo jin.

Tennis

Ukraine nominated two female tennis players to compete in the tournament.

Triathlon

Two Ukrainian triathletes qualified for the following events.

Weightlifting

Nine Ukrainian weightlifters qualified for the following events:

Men

Women

Wrestling

Men's freestyle

Men's Greco-Roman

Women's freestyle

See also
 Ukraine at the 2004 Summer Paralympics

References

External links
Official Report of the XXVIII Olympiad
Ukraine National Olympic Committee 

Nations at the 2004 Summer Olympics
2004
Summer Olympics